Leatherwood Creek is a tributary of Wills Creek,  long, in eastern Ohio in the United States.

Leatherwood Creek rises just outside the western boundary of the village of Barnesville in Warren Township in Belmont County and flows generally westward, first through a small portion of northeastern Beaver Township in Noble County, and into Guernsey County where it flows through Millwood, Richland, Wills, Center, and Cambridge townships, and through the villages of Quaker City, Salesville, and Lore City.  It flows into Wills Creek in the southern part of the city of Cambridge.

Leatherwood Creek was named for the leatherwood which grew along its course.

Flow rate
At the United States Geological Survey's stream gauge near the community of Kipling, the annual mean flow of the creek between 2000 and 2011 was 82.9 ft³/s (2 m³/s).  The highest recorded flow during the period was 10,100 ft³/s (286 m³/s) on September 18, 2004.  A reading of no flow was recorded on September 2, 2003.

See also
List of rivers of Ohio
Joseph C. Dylkes, the "Leatherwood God"

References

Rivers of Ohio
Rivers of Belmont County, Ohio
Rivers of Guernsey County, Ohio
Rivers of Noble County, Ohio